Morphome is one of the omes in biology to map and classify all the morphological features of species. Morphome is different from phenome in that it is the totality of morphological variants while phenome includes non-morphological variants.

See also
 Genome
 Proteome
 Interactome

References

 Automotive morphome analysis of medical-biological images. Pishak, Vasyl P.; Tymochko, K. B.; Antoniuk, O. P. Proc. SPIE Vol. 4607, p. 411-413, Selected Papers from Fifth International Conference on Correlation Optics, ; Ed.
 Strategies for the physiome project. Bassingthwaighte JB. Ann Biomed Eng. 2000 Aug;28(8):1043-58. Review.

Comparative anatomy